Osteochilus kappenii is a species of cyprinid fish endemic endemic to the Kapuas, western Borneo.

Named in honor of Dutch health officer E. F. J. Van Kappen, who collected Bornean fishes for Bleeker.

References

Taxa named by Pieter Bleeker
Fish described in 1856
Osteochilus